Insurgency in Mozambique may refer to any insurgency in either Portuguese or independent Mozambique:
 Mozambican War of Independence (1964–1974): Mozambican insurgents versus Portuguese colonial forces
 Mozambican Civil War (1977–1992): Various insurgent groups versus the Mozambican government
 RENAMO insurgency (2013–2019): RENAMO versus the Mozambican government
 Insurgency in Mozambique (2017–present): Ansar-al Sunna and ISIL versus the Mozambican government